Alucita rhaptica is a moth of the family Alucitidae. It is found in eastern Africa.

References

Moths described in 1920
Alucitidae
Moths of Asia
Taxa named by Edward Meyrick